Mariya Pisareva (born 9 April 1934) is a retired Soviet Union athlete who competed mainly in the High Jump. She trained at Zenit in Moscow

She competed in the 1956 Summer Olympics held in Melbourne, Australia in the High Jump where she won the silver medal jointly with Thelma Hopkins.

After her athletic career she married discus thrower Oto Grigalka.

External links 
 Profile at Sports-Reference.com

References

1934 births
Living people
Soviet female high jumpers
Russian female high jumpers
Olympic athletes of the Soviet Union
Olympic silver medalists for the Soviet Union
Athletes (track and field) at the 1956 Summer Olympics
Medalists at the 1956 Summer Olympics
Olympic silver medalists in athletics (track and field)